Corydoras latus is a tropical freshwater fish belonging to the Corydoradinae sub-family of the family Callichthyidae.  It originates in inland waters in South America, and is found in the Beni River basin in Bolivia.

The fish will grow in length up to 2.0 inches (5.2 centimeters).  It lives in a tropical climate in water with a 6.0 – 8.0 pH, a water hardness of 2 – 25 dGH, and a temperature range of 72 – 79 °F (22 – 26 °C).  It feeds on worms, benthic crustaceans, insects, and plant matter.  It lays eggs in dense vegetation and adults do not guard the eggs.

See also
 List of freshwater aquarium fish species

References 
 

Corydoras
Fish of Bolivia
Fish described in 1924